Thiemann is a surname. Notable people with the surname include:

Carl Thiemann (1881–1966), Bohemian printmaker
Elsa Thiemann (1910–1981), German photographer
Hugo Thiemann (1917–2012), Swiss electronics engineer
Ronald Frank Thiemann (1946–2012), American academic

German-language surnames